"How Great Is Our God" is a song written by Chris Tomlin, Jesse Reeves and Ed Cash. It was originally featured on Tomlin's album Arriving, that reached No. 1 on the Billboard Hot Christian Songs chart. It is also featured live on Tomlin's Live from Austin Music Hall album. As of November 2014, it also is the fifth most popular worship song today, according to CCLI's top 25 worship songs chart. It also reached No. 1 on Christian Music Weekly's 20 The Countdown Magazine's Top 20 Worship Songs Chart. The song won "Song of the Year" and "Worship Song of the Year" at the 2006 GMA Dove Awards, and "Worship Song of the Year" again at the 2008 GMA Dove Awards.

In 2009, gospel/jazz keyboardist Ben Tankard, presented his instrumental rendition of the song from Tankard's No. 1 charting album, Mercy, Mercy, Mercy.

At Passion 2012, Tomlin performed a new edition of this song called "How Great Is Our God: World Edition". This new version included the original lyrics sung in several different languages: English, Hindi, Indonesian, Russian, Spanish, Portuguese, Zulu, Afrikaans and Mandarin. It is the first track of his Chris Tomlin: The Essential Collection album.

Charts

Weekly charts

Year-end charts

Decade-end charts

Certifications

References 

Chris Tomlin songs
2004 songs
Songs written by Chris Tomlin
Songs written by Ed Cash
2004 singles
Sparrow Records singles